Harlem Hospital School of Nursing was a training school for African-American women, which was established at Harlem Hospital in Harlem, New York City in 1923. It was founded due to the lack of nursing schools in New York that accepted African American women. Until 1923, the Lincoln Hospital School for Nurses in The Bronx was the only school that allowed the enrollment of Black women.

When Mayor Hylan sought reelection in 1921, the NAACP and other community organizations lobbied the mayor to improve healthcare access.  Around the same time, Lurline Vassall of Brooklyn, was denied entry to the Bellevue Hospital School of Nursing because of her race.  Lurline's father William Vassall launched a campaign to open a school for black nurses. In response, Hylan's administration supported the creation of the Harlem Hospital School of Nursing.

The school opened on January 3, 1923, with a class of twenty black women.  It was a two and a half year program.

The Harlem Hospital School of Nursing closed in 1977.

Notable alumni and personnel 

 Renee Amoore
 Goldie Brangman-Dumpson - graduated in 1943
 Rosetta Burke - graduated in 1957.
 Irma Dryden - graduated in 1942 
 Alma Vessells John - attended 1926–1929.
 Hazel Johnson-Brown attended 1947-1950 the first Black female general in the United States Army and the first Black chief of the United States Army Nurse Corps.
 Salaria Kea O'Reilly - attended 1930–1934.
 Estelle Massey Osborne - taught in the late 1920s.

See also 
 Adah Belle Thoms

References

External links 
http://northbysouth.kenyon.edu/1998/health/hospny.htm

Nursing schools in New York City
Educational institutions established in 1923
Historically black universities and colleges in the United States
1923 establishments in New York City
Harlem
Education in Harlem